Jesús Bracamontes Zenizo (born 24 December 1951) is a Mexican former professional football player and manager.

Career 
Bracamontes gained prominence as the coach of Club Deportivo Guadalajara in the 1990s. He also served as assistant coach for the Mexico national team.

Bracamontes later worked as a long-serving football analyst along with Pablo Ramírez for the U.S. Spanish-language TV station Univision. On 31 May 2022 he announced his retirement on broadcasting on Univision.

Family 
Jesús is the father of Jacqueline Bracamontes, an actress and model who became famous after representing Mexico at the Miss Universe 2001 contest. His son is named after him.

Wife of Jesús is Jacqueline van Hoorde, who is of Belgian descent.

Jesús is also the oldest brother of Former player and coach Carlos Bracamontes.

References

Living people
1951 births
Mexican footballers
Footballers from Guadalajara, Jalisco
Association football midfielders
Mexican football managers
C.D. Guadalajara managers
Correcaminos UAT managers
Tecos F.C. managers
Atlético Morelia managers
Association football commentators
Mexican sports journalists